Bishop Okoye Spiritan Secondary School (often abbreviated as BOSSS), is a private, coeducational
Roman Catholic high school in Oyigbo, Rivers State, Nigeria. It is located in the Roman Catholic Diocese of Port Harcourt. The school is named in honor of the first Bishop of the Port Harcourt diocese, Bishop Godfrey Okoye, whose contributions to the educational system in Southeastern Nigeria were far-reaching. The school's main campus is situated on a large area of land in the town of Afam, covering more than 300 plots of land.

School overview
BOSSS is owned and operated by the congregation of the Holy Ghost Fathers and Brothers South East Province of Nigeria. The school is accredited and prepares students to be active and engaged participants in an
interconnected world. The school also offers boarding services to students of all nationalities. The current principal is Rev. Fr. Jude Ekemgba, C.S.Sp.

Admission
As many students move from various curricula, prospective students are required to sit for an entrance examination. The school organizes an informal interview with the student which forms part of the overall assessment. Admission is at the school's discretion and the school's decision is final. However, unsuccessful applicants may apply again at a later date if they believe they will do better at the entrance examinations.

See also
Godfrey Okoye
List of schools in Port Harcourt
List of Roman Catholic churches in Port Harcourt

References

External links

Roman Catholic Diocese of Port Harcourt
Secondary schools in Rivers State
Spiritan schools
Catholic schools in Nigeria
Educational institutions established in 2006
2006 establishments in Nigeria